100,000 Pounds is a 1948 Greek film directed by Alekos Leivaditis and starring Mimis Fotopoulos, Dinos Iliopoulos and Kaiti Panou. The film was produced by Mer Film.

The film is directed by Alekos Leivadiris (an actor and a director in theatre and film) with operator (photographer) Prodromos Meravidis and writer Nikos Tsiforos. The music was composed by Menelaos Theofanidis.

Before the movie was released to the screen, it had two working titles: 100,000 Pounds and Gabri me .

Cast
Mimis Fotopoulos ..... Kleomenis
Dinos Iliopoulos ..... Chronis
Kaiti Panou ..... Pagona Katife
Alekos Leivaditis ..... Frixos Delapis
Giorgos Damasiotis ..... Dionysis Katifes
Tzeny Stavropoulou
Giannis Ioannidis
Andreas Mitakis
Soula Emanouil
Filios Filippidis ..... Agop

External links

1948 films
Greek-language films
Greek comedy films
1948 comedy films
Greek black-and-white films